"Wild basil" is a common name for several plants in the mint family (Lamiaceae):

 the genus Clinopodium, in particular:
 Clinopodium vulgare (wild basil)
 Clinopodium menthifolium subsp. ascendens (ascending wild basil)
 Clinopodium gracile (slender wild basil)
 Clinopodium arkansanum (low calamint, limestone wild basil)
 Cunila origanoides (dittany)
 Ocimum gratissimum (African basil), e.g. in Hawai'i
 Perilla frutescens (perilla)
 the genus Pycnanthemum (mountainmints), in particular:
 Pycnanthemum incanum (hoary mountainmint), e.g. in the continental U.S.
 Pycnanthemum setosum
 Pycnanthemum verticillatum